Now Deh is a village in Yeylaqi-ye Ardeh Rural District, Pareh Sar District, Rezvanshahr County, Gilan Province, Iran. At the 2006 census, its population was 156, in 37 families.

References 

Populated places in Rezvanshahr County